The Olympia Hempfest is an annual cannabis event in Olympia, Washington, in the United States. The event was first held in 2004, and was founded by Jeremy Miller, the same person who began the Cannabis Farmers Market in Tacoma. It attracts up to 20,000 participants. The 2015 event was held in Heritage Park in downtown Olympia.

References

External links

 

2004 establishments in Washington (state)
Annual events in Washington (state)
Cannabis events in the United States
Cannabis in Washington (state)
Festivals in Olympia, Washington
Recurring events established in 2004